Ronna Renee Reeves (born September 21, 1966 in Big Spring, Texas) is an American country music singer. Between 1990 and 1998, she released five studio albums, including three on Mercury Records; she has also charted five singles on the Hot Country Songs charts. She was also nominated for Top New Female Vocalist at the Academy of Country Music Awards in 1992. Her highest-charting single was "The More I Learn (The Less I Understand About Love)", which reached No. 49 in 1992.

In 1993, she was named one of the New Faces of Country Music by the Country Radio Seminar.

After leaving Mercury in 1994, Reeves signed to River North Records and released two more albums. The second album she recorded for River North Records, Day 14, was more pop-oriented and she simply went by Ronna. She recorded a duet "There's Love on the Line" with Sammy Kershaw on her album The More I Learn as well a duet with Peter Cetera, on a cover of ABBA's "SOS", on his album One Clear Voice.

She is perhaps best remembered as a regular on The Statler Brothers Show during the mid-1990s, as well as opening act on many of their tours.

Since 2010, Reeves has owned Showbiz-Ro Music, an independent Songplugging & Writer Management Service, in Nashville, Tennessee, alongside Liz Morin.

Discography

Albums

Compilation albums

Singles

Music videos

Nominations
Academy of Country Music
 1991 Top New Female Vocalist

References

1966 births
American women country singers
American country singer-songwriters
Living people
Mercury Records artists
Singer-songwriters from Texas
People from Big Spring, Texas
Country musicians from Texas
21st-century American women